Daviesia ulicifolia, commonly known as gorse bitter-pea, is a species of flowering plant in the family Fabaceae and is endemic to south-eastern Australia. It is a rigid, openly-branched shrub with sharply-pointed, narrow elliptic, narrow egg-shaped, rarely egg-shaped phyllodes and usually orange-yellow and dark red flowers.

Description

Taxonomy
Daviesia ulicifolia was first formally described by English botanist Henry Cranke Andrews in 1803 in The Botanist's Repository for New, and Rare Plants. The specific epithet (ulicifolia) means "gorse-leaved", referring to the distribution of this leucopogon, compared to others in the genus.

In 1997, Gregory T. Chandler and Michael Crisp described six subspecies of D. ulicifolia in Australian Systematic Botany, and the names are accepted by the Australian Plant Census:

Distribution and habitat
Gorse bitter-pea is widely distributed in Australia, where it grows in open forest in all six states, but not the Northern Territory.
 Subspecies aridicola grows in arid areas of the Great Victoria Desert and Murchison bioregions of Western Australia, in a broad area of South Australia, and in the far south-west of New South Wales.
 Subspecies incarnata grows in hilly or mountain areas in the Mount Lofty Ranges of South Australia and in a few isolated places further south.
 Subspecies pilligensis grows in heathy woodland and open forest from south-eastern Queensland to the western slopes of New South Wales, especially in the Pilliga Scrub.
 Subspecies ruscifolia grows in forest from central New South Wales and the Australian Capital Territory to the Grampians National Park in Victoria, and in Tasmania.
 Subspecies stenophylla is mostly found in coastal areas, often in disturbed habitats from the wet tropics of far north Queensland to the Central Coast of New South Wales.
 Subspecies ulicifolia mostly grows in forest and is widespread from south-eastern Queensland, through most of Victoria to south-eastern South Australia and Tasmania.

References

ulicifolia
Flora of New South Wales
Flora of Queensland
Flora of Tasmania
Flora of Victoria (Australia)
Flora of South Australia
Flora of the Australian Capital Territory
Rosids of Western Australia
Plants described in 1803
Taxa named by Henry Cranke Andrews